A by-election was held for the Australian House of Representatives seat of Moreton on 5 November 1983. This was triggered by the resignation of Liberal Party MP James Killen.

Candidates

Liberal Party of Australia – Don Cameron, previously the member for Griffith (1966–1977) and Fadden (1977–1983).
Australian Pensioner Pressure Group – Norman Eather.
National Humanitarian Party – Marcus Platen.
Australian Labor Party – Barbara Robson.

Results

See also
 List of Australian federal by-elections

References

1983 elections in Australia
Queensland federal by-elections
1980s in Queensland
November 1983 events in Australia